The 1974 Richmond Spiders football team was an American football team that represented the University of Richmond as a member of the Southern Conference (SoCon) during the 1974 NCAA Division I football season. In their first season under head coach Jim Tait, Richmond compiled a 5–5 record, with a mark of 3–3 in conference play, finishing finishing tied for third in the SoCon.

Schedule

References

Richmond
Richmond Spiders football seasons
Richmond Spiders